Colbrand is a surname. Notable people with the surname include:

Colbrand (giant), a giant from English mythology, killed by Guy of Warwick
Colbrand baronets
James Colbrand (before 1544–1600), English politician